Croconazole (INN) is an imidazole antifungal.

References

External links
 Croconazole

Vinylidene compounds
Chlorobenzenes
Imidazole antifungals
Lanosterol 14α-demethylase inhibitors
Phenol ethers